Big Town After Dark is a 1947 American film noir drama film directed by William C. Thomas and written by Whitman Chambers. The film stars Phillip Reed, Hillary Brooke, Richard Travis, Ann Gillis, Vince Barnett, Joe Sawyer and Robert Kent. It was released on December 12, 1947 by Paramount Pictures.The film was the third in a series of four films based on the long-running radio program Big Town.

Plot

Cast 
Phillip Reed as Steve Wilson 
Hillary Brooke as Lorelei Kilbourne
Richard Travis as Chuck LaRue
Ann Gillis as Susan Peabody LaRue 
Vince Barnett as Louie Snead
Joe Sawyer as Monk
Robert Kent as Jake Sebastian 
Charles Arnt as Amos Peabody
Joseph Allen as Wally Blake
William Haade as Marcus

See also  
Big Town radio series

References

External links 
 

1947 films
1947 crime drama films
American black-and-white films
American crime drama films
Films about journalists
Films based on radio series
Films directed by William C. Thomas
Paramount Pictures films
1940s English-language films
1940s American films
Big Town